Francesco Molinari (born 8 November 1982) is an Italian professional golfer. He won the 2018 Open Championship, his first and only major victory, and the first major won by an Italian professional golfer. The Open Championship win capped a successful season in which he won the 2018 BMW PGA Championship, his fifth win on the European Tour, and the Quicken Loans National, his first PGA Tour win. At the end of the season, Molinari won 5 out of 5 points as Europe won the 2018 Ryder Cup.

Molinari has been in the top 100 of the World Rankings continuously since the end of 2008. Playing with his brother Edoardo, they won the 2009 Omega Mission Hills World Cup, Italy's only win in the event. Molinari won the 2010 WGC-HSBC Champions and has represented Europe in three winning Ryder Cup teams, in 2010, 2012 and 2018.

Early life and amateur career
Molinari was born on 8 November 1982 in Turin, Italy. He is the younger brother of Edoardo Molinari. As an amateur, he won the Italian Amateur Stroke Play Championship twice, and the Italian Match Play Championship in 2004. Molinari turned professional later that year.

Professional career
Molinari earned his European Tour card for 2005 through qualifying school. He finished in 86th place on the tour's Order of Merit in his rookie season.

In May 2006, Molinari claimed his first European Tour victory, becoming the first Italian since Massimo Mannelli in 1980 to win the Telecom Italia Open. This victory helped him finish 38th on the Order of Merit. He did not win on Tour between 2007 and 2009 but during that time he recorded twenty top-10 finishes including three runner-up finishes. He finished 60th on the Order of Merit in 2007, 24th in 2008 and 14th in the Race to Dubai in 2009. In October 2009, Molinari reached the top 50 of the Official World Golf Ranking for the first time.

On 29 November 2009, Molinari, along with his older brother Edoardo, led Italy to their first World Cup victory at the Omega Mission Hills World Cup in China.

On 7 November 2010, Molinari won the WGC-HSBC Champions in Shanghai, China. He defeated Lee Westwood by one stroke, finishing at 19-under par. The win moved him into 14th in the Official World Golf Ranking, his highest ranking for eight years. He also recorded eleven top-10 finishes including two runner-up finishes en route to a 5th-place finish in the Race to Dubai.

In October 2010, Molinari represented Europe in the 2010 Ryder Cup which took place at Celtic Manor Resort, teaming up with his brother Edoardo in the four-balls (halved against Stuart Cink and Matt Kuchar) and foursomes (lost against Zach Johnson and Hunter Mahan). He then lost the singles match by 4 and 3 against Tiger Woods on the final day. Europe defeated the United States, 14–13.

Molinari had a steady 2011 without any further victories but did record seven top-10 finishes, including a 3rd place at the WGC-Cadillac Championship. He finished the year ranked 21st in the Race to Dubai.

Molinari picked up his third win on the European Tour on 6 May 2012 at the Reale Seguros Open de España. He was four strokes out of the lead going into the final round but fired a 65 (−7), the best round of the tournament, to win by three strokes over Alejandro Cañizares, Søren Kjeldsen and Pablo Larrazábal. In July 2012, the week before the Open Championship, Molinari lost in a playoff at the Aberdeen Asset Management Scottish Open. He was defeated on the first playoff hole by Jeev Milkha Singh.

Molinari gained an automatic selection for the 2012 Ryder Cup, where he played the foursomes with Lee Westwood on Friday, losing by 3 and 2 to Jason Dufner and Zach Johnson; he then teamed up in the four-balls with Justin Rose, losing by 5 and 4 against Bubba Watson and Webb Simpson. On the final day, he halved with Tiger Woods in the last singles match. The point meant Europe not only completed a comeback from 10–6 down at the start of the final day to retain the cup, but won it outright by a score of 14 points to 13.

During the 2013 and 2014 seasons Molinari did not register a tournament win, but his steady position in the top fifty of the OWGR allowed him to play several PGA Tour events as a non-member, where he reached three top ten finishes; among these the most prestigious result was the 6th place at the 2014 Players Championship. These results allowed him to earn a full PGA Tour card for the 2014–15 season.

In 2015 and 2016, Molinari shared his time between the European Tour and PGA Tour. In September 2016 he became the first Italian to win his national open twice with a 1 shot victory over Danny Willett at the 2016 Italian Open. Other notable results in Europe were the 2nd places collected at the 2015 Open de España and 2016 Open de France, while in the U.S. he collected a 3rd place at the 2015 Memorial Tournament. In the same year he also recorded a hole in one at the iconic 16th hole of the Waste Management Phoenix Open.

Molinari recorded his fifth European Tour win and first Rolex Series titles in May 2018, with victory in the European Tour's flagship event, the BMW PGA Championship. He produced a flawless final round to see off Rory McIlroy by two strokes. The win took Molinari level with Costantino Rocca, for most European Tour wins by an Italian. In the same year, Molinari won the Quicken Loans National in a dominating fashion by shooting a 62 on Sunday to win by eight strokes, the first PGA Tour win for an Italian since 1947.

At the 2018 Open Championship, Molinari won the tournament with a score of −8, pairing with Tiger Woods in the final round. The win at the Open Championship moved him to sixth place in the Official World Golf Ranking, the highest ranking of his career to date.

In September 2018, Molinari qualified for the European team participating in the 2018 Ryder Cup. Europe defeated the U.S. team 17 to 10. Molinari became the first player ever to go 5–0–0. He paired with Tommy Fleetwood to win all four fourball and foursome matches. He also won his singles match against Phil Mickelson.

On 18 November 2018, Molinari won the season-long Race to Dubai title on the European Tour. The victory was worth $1,250,000.

On 16 December 2018, he received the 2018 BBC World Sport Star of the Year award (formerly known as the BBC Overseas Sports Personality of the Year award), Molinari was the first Italian to receive this prize.

On 10 March 2019, Molinari won the Arnold Palmer Invitational for his third PGA Tour victory of his career. He teed off 10 groups ahead of the leaders on the final day and 5 stokes behind, making three birdies and no bogeys on his first seven holes. On the 8th hole, from well off the green he holed a chip for another birdie and made the turn in 32 (−4). He made four more birdies on the back nine, including a 43-foot putt at the 72nd hole, to shoot a final-round 64 that ended up giving him a two-stroke win over Matt Fitzpatrick, who shot a final-round 71.

In April 2019, Molinari was the 54-hole leader at the Masters at 13 under, two strokes clear of Tony Finau and Tiger Woods, after a six-under-par 66 third round. Molinari held the lead for two thirds of the final round, until he reached the par-3 12th, where his tee shot found the water, resulting in a double bogey. He found the water again on the 15th, which led to another double bogey to fall out of contention. He finished with a round of 74 and T5 finish, still his best performance at the Masters to date.

Coaches
Molinari has worked since 2018 with Dave Alred on several mental aspects of his game.

Personal life
Molinari is a fan of Italian football team Internazionale, he also supports West Ham United after Italian football manager Gianfranco Zola started managing the East London side in 2008.

Charity
Molinari is an ambassador for Borne, a medical research charity looking to identify the causes of premature birth.

Amateur wins
2002 Italian Amateur Stroke Play Championship, Italian Amateur Foursomes Championship (with Edoardo Molinari)
2004 Italian Amateur Stroke Play Championship, Italian Match Play Championship, Sherry Cup (ESP)

Professional wins (10)

PGA Tour wins (3)

European Tour wins (6)

 The BMW PGA Championship is also a Rolex Series tournament.

European Tour playoff record (0–3)

Other wins (2)

Major championships

Wins (1)

Results timeline

CUT = missed the half-way cut
"T" = tied

Summary

Most consecutive cuts made – 12 (2013 Open – 2017 Masters)
Longest streak of top-10s – 3 (2018 Open – 2019 Masters)

Results in The Players Championship

CUT = missed the halfway cut
"T" indicates a tie for a place
C = Cancelled after the first round due to the COVID-19 pandemic

World Golf Championships

Wins (1)

Results timeline
Results not in chronological order prior to 2015.
 
1Cancelled due to COVID-19 pandemic

QF, R16, R32, R64 = Round in which player lost in match play
NT = No tournament
"T" = Tied

PGA Tour career summary

^ Molinari became member of the PGA Tour in 2015, so he is not included in the money list before that.

Team appearances
Amateur
European Boys' Team Championship (representing Italy): 1999
European Youths' Team Championship (representing Italy): 2000
European Amateur Team Championship (representing Italy): 2001, 2003
Eisenhower Trophy (representing Italy): 2002, 2004
Bonallack Trophy (representing Europe): 2004
Palmer Cup (representing Europe): 2004 (winners)
St Andrews Trophy (representing the Continent of Europe): 2004

Professional
World Cup (representing Italy): 2006, 2007, 2008, 2009 (winners), 2011, 2013, 2016
Seve Trophy (representing Continental Europe): 2009, 2011, 2013 (winners)
Ryder Cup (representing Europe): 2010 (winners), 2012 (winners), 2018 (winners)
Royal Trophy (representing Europe): 2012
Hero Cup (representing Continental Europe): 2023 (winners)

Ryder Cup points record

Notes

References

External links

Italian male golfers
European Tour golfers
PGA Tour golfers
Winners of men's major golf championships
Ryder Cup competitors for Europe
BBC Sports Personality World Sport Star of the Year winners
Sportspeople from Turin
1982 births
Living people